The Vels was an American new wave and synth-pop band formed in Philadelphia, Pennsylvania in 1980. The band consisted of lead vocalist Alice Cohen (as Alice Desoto), keyboardist Chris Larkin and bassist Charles Hanson.

Career
The Vels began when Charles Hanson, former member of the 1970s New Orleans punk group, the Normals, invited Chris Larkin and Alice Desoto to join him for a show at the now defunct Love Club in Philadelphia. The band used low tech synthesizers, drum machines, and bass guitar. The Philadelphia Inquirer music critic, Lee Paris was there, and wrote a positive review. The Vels were a prominent fixture on the Philadelphia music scene of the early 1980s. They caught the attention of Mercury Records and signed a recording contract with them.

The Vels' debut studio album, Velocity (1984) was recorded at Compass Point Studios in Nassau, Bahamas with producer Steven Stanley, known for his work with Tom Tom Club. Chris Larkin had left sometime before their second studio album, House of Miracles (1986) and it was recorded without him, this time with production by Steve Levine, known for his work with Culture Club.

A music video for their song "Look My Way" was filmed in London, and became popular during the early days of MTV.

In 1986, the Vels toured the U.S. as the opening act for British band the Psychedelic Furs, but disbanded in 1987.

Keyboardist and singer, Chris Larkin, died from complications due to pneumonia, on November 21, 2007.

Discography
Studio albums
 Velocity (1984)
 House of Miracles (1986)

Singles
 "Private World" / "Hieroglyphics" (1984)
 "Look My Way" / "Tell Me Something" (1984)
 "Girl Most Likely To" (1986)

References

External links
 
 Velocity by the Vels (published Oct. 10, 2008)

American new wave musical groups
American synth-pop groups
Musical groups from Philadelphia
Mercury Records artists
Musical groups established in 1980
Musical groups disestablished in 1987
Synth-pop new wave musical groups